Kelly Bulkeley, Ph.D., (born 1962) is an author and researcher in the fields of dreams and the psychology of religion. He is currently a senior editor of the APA journal Dreaming: The Journal of the Association for the Study of Dreams. He co-wrote the 2006 film The Zodiac, which had a limited theatrical release. His surname at birth was spelled "Bulkley", and it appears this way on this film. He is a descendant of Peter Bulkley, whose name also carries these two variant spellings.

Bulkeley currently lives in Portland, Oregon.

Theories and stances
Bulkeley has  compared dreams to a kind of 'play', in which different behaviours and strategies can be rehearsed. Nightmares, for example, may be warnings that a negative occurrence is possible, and we should be prepared for it.

Publications

Books
 The Wilderness of Dreams: Exploring the Religious Meanings of Dreams in Modern Western Culture (SUNY Press, 1994).
 Spiritual Dreaming: A Cross-Cultural and Historical Journey (Paulist Press, 1995).
 Among All These Dreamers: Essays on Dreaming and Modern Society (Editor) (SUNY Press, 1996).
 An Introduction to the Psychology of Dreaming (Praeger, 1997)
 Dreamcatching (Co-authored with Alan Siegel) (Three Rivers Press, 1998).
 Visions of the Night: Dreams, Religion, and Psychology (SUNY Press, 1999).
 Transforming Dreams (John Wiley & Sons, 2000)
 Dreams: A Reader on the Religious, Cultural, and Psychological Dimensions of Dreaming (Editor) (Palgrave, 2001)
 Dreams of Healing: Transforming Nightmares into Visions of Hope (Paulist Press, 2003)
 The Wondering Brain: Thinking About Religion With and Beyond Cognitive Neuroscience (Routledge, 2005)
 Dreaming Beyond Death (co-authored with Patricia Bulkley) (Beacon Press, 2005)
 Soul, Psyche, Brain: New Directions in the Study of Religion and Brain-Mind Science (Editor) (Palgrave, 2005)
 American Dreamers: What Dreams Tell Us about the Political Psychology of Conservatives, Liberals, and Everyone Else (Beacon Press, 2008)
 Dreaming in the World’s Religions: A Comparative History (New York University Press, 2008)
 Dreaming in Christianity and Islam: Culture, Conflict, and Creativity (co-edited with Kate Adams and Patricia M. Davis) (Rutgers University Press, 2009)
 Dreaming in the Classroom: Practices, Methods, and Resources in Dream Education (co-authored with Phil King and Bernard Welt) (SUNY Press, 2011)
 Teaching Jung (co-edited with Clodagh Weldon) (Oxford University Press, 2011)
 Children’s Dreams (co-authored with Patricia Bulkley) (Rowman & Littlefield, 2012)
 Lucid Dreaming (2 volumes, co-edited with Ryan Hurd) (ABC-Clio, 2014)
 Big Dreams: The Science of Highly Memorable Dreaming (Oxford University Press, 2016)
 Lucrecia the Dreamer: Prophecy, Cognitive Science, and the Spanish Inquisition (Stanford University Press, 2018)

References

External links
Sleep and Dream Database

Living people
1962 births
Writers from Portland, Oregon
Oneirologists